Maria Dimitrova Petrova (born 13 November 1975) is a Bulgarian rhythmic gymnast. She is a three-time (1993, 1994, 1995) World All-around champion and a three-time (1992, 1993, 1994) European All-around champion.

Career
Born in Plovdiv, Bulgaria, Petrova began her training at the age of five at local club Trakia Plovdiv Club, coached by Natalia Moravenova. By 1991, she was coached by Neshka Robeva at the Levski Sofia Club. In her first World Championship appearance, Petrova placed second in the team competition after a hoop drop.

Petrova was one of the favorites to win gold but found herself finishing in fifth in the all-around finals at the Barcelona Olympics after a penalty of .20 was imposed due to the zipper on the back of her leotard that had broken during her hoop exercise. A few months later, at the World Championships, Petrova took second place behind Russia's Oxana Kostina and ahead of Belarusian Larissa Lukyanenko.

In 1993, Petrova performed with her Panovaesque ball to an Indian melody. She also competed in a ribbon exercise, and a small-toss filled clubs routine to Suzanne Vega's "Tom's Diner". Her final performance to Carmina Burana caused a great crowd ovation. She went on to win the all-around World title, as well as three more gold medals (ball, hoop, ribbon) and a bronze medal (clubs).

She went on to win one more European title and two more world titles (shared in 1995 with Yekaterina Serebrianskaya), tying her with countrywoman Maria Gigova for the most wins in the latter category.

Competing in her second Olympics, Petrova was one of the front runner to win the gold at the 1996 Summer Olympics in Atlanta, however a series of mistakes left her finishing in 5th place in the All-around Finals behind Russia's Amina Zaripova.

Although she had tried to retire several times after her first World title, Petrova continued competing as a favor to the Bulgarian national team, which was in a rebuilding phase after the Eastern European Communist collapse.

Petrova shares the world record for most individual world all-around rhythmic gymnastics titles with Maria Gigova, Evgenia Kanaeva and Yana Kudryavtseva. Petrova's three titles were earned in 1993, 1994, and 1995 (shared).

She is currently a judge in rhythmic gymnastics.

Personal life 
In 1998, Petrova married Bulgarian footballer Borislav Mihaylov.

Achievements 

 Petrova has who won 3 world titles for three consecutive years (1993, 1994, 1995 tied with Ekaterina Serebrianskaya) equaled only by fellow countrywoman Maria Gigova (1969, 1971 tied with Galima Shugurova, 1973) and Russian gymnasts Evgenia Kanaeva (2009, 2010, 2011) and Yana Kudryavtseva (2013, 2014, 2015).

Routine music information

References

External links
 
 NSA Bulgarian gymnasts
 
 
 

1975 births
Living people
Bulgarian rhythmic gymnasts
Sportspeople from Plovdiv
Olympic gymnasts of Bulgaria
Gymnasts at the 1992 Summer Olympics
Gymnasts at the 1996 Summer Olympics
Medalists at the Rhythmic Gymnastics World Championships
Medalists at the Rhythmic Gymnastics European Championships
Universiade medalists in gymnastics
Universiade gold medalists for Bulgaria
Medalists at the 1995 Summer Universiade